Arizona Free Enterprise Club's Freedom Club PAC v. Bennett, 564 U.S. 721 (2011), is a decision by the Supreme Court of the United States.

In 1998, Arizona voters approved the ballot measure known as the Clean Elections Act.  When it was passed, the Clean Elections law established public financing for elections of statewide office campaigns.  Candidates who choose to participate in the system must collect a specific number of $5 donations.  This makes them eligible to receive government funds to run their campaigns.  Under the law as passed, if a participating candidate is outspent by a non-participating opponent, the participating candidate receives added government funds matching the money raised privately by the non-participating candidate, up to three times the original government subsidy.  The most prominent candidates filing under the Clean Elections system were Janet Napolitano, who was elected Governor in 2002, and Jan Brewer, who was elected Governor in 2010.

Lawsuit
The plaintiffs filed a legal challenge against the Arizona Clean Elections Commission on August 21, 2008 in the United States District Court for the District of Arizona.  Just months earlier, the Supreme Court had heard Davis v. Federal Election Commission (2008). Under federal law, if candidates raised $350,000 of their own money, their opponent would be awarded special public fundraising advantages, a provision known as the “Millionaire’s Amendment.”  However, the Supreme Court struck this provision down, holding that the “goal of ‘leveling’ electoral opportunities does not justify a campaign finance system in which “the vigorous exercise of the right to use personal funds to finance campaign speech produces fundraising advantages for opponents in the competitive context of electoral politics.”  According to the Plaintiffs, the Clean Elections system produced a chilling effect on speech because it “seeks to equalize funding.”  But advocates of the Clean Elections law argue that the system deters corruption because candidates do not have to cater to special interest groups.

On January 20, 2010, Federal Judge Roslyn Silver struck down the matching funds provision of the Arizona Clean Elections law as unconstitutional.  Judge Silver agreed with the Plaintiffs that the matching funds provision could not stand under Davis, although she referred to the result as "illogical" and referred to the holding in Davis as "an ipse dixit unsupported by the slightest veneer of reasoning to hide the obvious judicial fiat by which it is reached."  Silver suspended her order while the Arizona Clean Elections Commission appealed to the United States Court of Appeals for the Ninth Circuit.  The case was heard by the Ninth Circuit Court on April 12, 2010.  The Ninth Circuit reversed, holding that the matching funds provision of Arizona's law was analytically distinct from the millionaire's amendment.

The Supreme Court agreed to hear an appeal of McComish. (This case was consolidated with Arizona Free Enterprise Club Freedom Club PAC v. Bennett prior to consideration by the Supreme Court.)  Oral arguments were heard March 28, 2011. On June 27, 2011, the Supreme Court reversed the Ninth Circuit Court of Appeals' ruling and declared matching funds schemes designed to "level the playing field" unconstitutional in a 5–4 decision.

Case timeline
August 21, 2008: Case filed in U.S. District Court.

July 17, 2009: Deadline for opposition brief.

July 31, 2009: Deadline for reply brief.

August 7, 2009: Hearing deadline.

January 5, 2010: Plaintiffs file preliminary injunction asking Judge Roslyn O. Silver to stop the issuance of matching funds for the 2010 election.

January 15, 2010: Hearing on motions for summary judgment

January 20, 2010: Judge Silver strikes down Clean Elections as unconstitutional, but puts a stay on her order that allows for the state to appeal.

January 27, 2010: Plaintiffs ask 9th Circuit Court of Appeals to remove the stay and strike down the Matching Funds provision of Clean Elections immediately. It is refused.

February 3, 2010: Plaintiffs file emergency appeal to repeal the stay on Judge Silver's order with Supreme Court Justice Anthony Kennedy. The appeal is refused and gives the 9th Circuit until June 1 to rule on the appeal by the state.

May 21, 2010: 9th Circuit rules in favor of the state in appeal, saying that Clean Elections' Matching Funds is constitutional.

May 24, 2010: Plaintiffs file emergency motion to vacate the stay with the Supreme Court of the United States.

June 1, 2010: The Court refuses the stay request on the grounds that Goldwater must state, and had not stated, an intent to appeal the Ninth Circuit decision. Goldwater files a third application to lift stay adding its intent to appeal the 9th Circuit's decision.

June 8, 2010: The Supreme Court blocks the distribution of Clean Elections for 2010, removing the district court's stay.

August 17, 2010: Plaintiffs lawyers make formal appeal to the Supreme Court.

November 29, 2010: Supreme Court agrees to consider formal appeal.

March 28, 2011: Supreme Court is scheduled to hear oral arguments.

June 27, 2011: Supreme Court reverses Ninth Circuit Court of Appeals' ruling and declares matching funds unconstitutional.

References

External links
 

United States Supreme Court cases
United States Supreme Court cases of the Roberts Court
2013 in United States case law
United States Free Speech Clause case law
Legal history of Arizona
Political history of Arizona
United States elections case law